Dædalus is an academic journal founded in 1955 to replace the Proceedings of the American Academy of Arts and Sciences, the volume and numbering system of which it continues. In 1958, it began quarterly publication as The Journal of the American Academy of Arts and Sciences. The journal is published by MIT Press on behalf of the American Academy of Arts and Sciences. Dædalus publishes by invitation only.

In January 2021, Dædalus became an open access publication.

References

External links 
 
American Academy of Arts and Sciences
Dædalus at MIT Press

Publications established in 1955
MIT Press academic journals
Quarterly journals
English-language journals
Multidisciplinary humanities journals
Academic journals associated with learned and professional societies
1955 establishments in Massachusetts